Riverton is an unincorporated community in Gill Township, Sullivan County, in the U.S. state of Indiana.

The community is part of the Terre Haute Metropolitan Statistical Area.

History
Riverton was laid out in 1887, and was named after its location on the Wabash River. A post office was established at Riverton in 1887, and remained in operation until it was discontinued in 1905.

Geography

References

Unincorporated communities in Sullivan County, Indiana
Unincorporated communities in Indiana
Terre Haute metropolitan area